The Lexington and Ohio Railroad  was a shortline railroad formerly operating between a connection with Norfolk Southern at Lexington to Versailles, Kentucky, about . Upon its 1996 startup the railroad was a Gulf & Ohio subsidiary, the railroad was later sold R.J. Corman Railroad Group, who has operated the line as R. J. Corman Railroad/Central Kentucky Lines since 2003.

References

Defunct Kentucky railroads
Railway companies established in 1996
Railway companies disestablished in 2003
Gulf and Ohio Railways
Transportation in Woodford County, Kentucky
Transportation in Lexington, Kentucky
Versailles, Kentucky